"All Happy Families..." is the 56th episode of the HBO original series The Sopranos and the fourth of the show's fifth season. Written by Toni Kalem and directed by Rodrigo García, it originally aired on March 28, 2004.

Starring
 James Gandolfini as Tony Soprano
 Lorraine Bracco as Jennifer Melfi 
 Edie Falco as Carmela Soprano
 Michael Imperioli as Christopher Moltisanti 
 Dominic Chianese as Corrado Soprano, Jr. *
 Steven Van Zandt as Silvio Dante
 Tony Sirico as Paulie Gualtieri
 Robert Iler as Anthony Soprano, Jr. 
 Jamie-Lynn DiScala as Meadow Soprano
 Drea de Matteo as Adriana La Cerva
 Aida Turturro as Janice Soprano Baccalieri *
 John Ventimiglia as Artie Bucco
 Steve Buscemi as Tony Blundetto

* = credit only

Guest starring
 Jerry Adler as Hesh Rabkin

Also guest starring

Synopsis
In New York, Lorraine and Jason are murdered by Joey Peeps and Billy Leotardo after they refuse to give their collections to Johnny. Little Carmine  is advised by fellow capo Rusty Millio to take aggressive action. Tony advises his capos and soldiers not to get involved in the New York feud.

Feech comes in to see Tony and regales the younger mobsters with stories from his mob career, including one when Tony and Jackie Aprile, Sr established themselves by robbing his card game. Tony laughs at this, but Feech asks if he can run the game once again. Tony allows him to supervise it and get 20% of its profits. At the card game, Feech's jokes and anecdotes annoy Tony but generate uproarious laughter from his crew. In an argument, Carmela has told Tony he has no friends, just "flunkies" who laugh at his jokes because he is the boss. As a test, Tony makes a feeble joke to see if the card players laugh—and they do.

Feech's hired goons carjack the guests at the wedding of the daughter of Tony's close friend, Dr. Ira Fried, and sell the vehicles to Johnny's men. Tony then recalls the joke he told at the card game and realizes the only person not laughing was Feech. He reluctantly decides that Feech—although well-liked and respected—has to be dealt with. Tony sends Christopher and Benny to Feech's house, where they trick him into hiding a truckload of flatscreen TVs in his garage in return for payment, plus a TV for himself. The following day, a parole officer visits Feech and asks about the flatscreen in his living room, then asks to see his garage; Feech has to comply. On the bus back to prison, he gazes at the outside world.

Dr. Melfi finds that Tony has left a basket of expensive toiletries and a bathrobe in her waiting room. Later, stressing the misspelled words, she reads the gift card to her own therapist, Dr. Elliot Kupferberg. Tony apologizes for calling her a "cunt." Kupferberg tells her the gift represents ablution.

A.J. is having a difficult time in school and disrespects Carmela. Tony and Carmela visit A.J.'s guidance counselor, Robert Wegler. Carmela partly blames A.J.'s unsatisfactory academic record on her separation from Tony. Tony buys A.J. a new Nissan Xterra as a "motivational tool" to get better grades, saying that Carmela will keep the keys until his grades improve.

A.J. asks his mother if he can attend a Mudvayne concert in New York with friends. Carmela agrees on the condition that he spends the night at Meadow's apartment; but on the night, A.J. calls Meadow to tell her that he will not be coming, and she reluctantly agrees to cover for him. Staying in a hotel, A.J. and his friends get drunk and high. The next morning, A.J. wakes with his face Krazy Glued to the carpet, and his eyebrows shaved off and redrawn with a permanent marker. In the ensuing argument at home, A.J. sells a false story, which Tony appears willing to buy. Carmela blames herself for A.J.'s actions and says Tony should take A.J. to live with him. At Tony's, A.J. bonds with his father, Tony B, and Artie as they watch TV until Tony sends him upstairs to do his homework.

Wegler invites Carmela to lunch. She discusses A.J.'s troubles as well as her own. He recommends that she read Gustave Flaubert's novel Madame Bovary, noting parallels between Carmela and the book's protagonist. She returns to the empty family house.

First appearances
 Rusty Millio: A capo in the Lupertazzi family and ally of Little Carmine.
 Robert Wegler: A.J.'s school guidance counselor who also goes out with Carmela for lunch.
 Justin and Jason Blundetto: The twin sons of Tony Blundetto.
 Dante Greco: an associate/soldier in the Aprile crew.

Final appearances
 Michele "Feech"  LaManna: Is sent back to prison on a parole violation by Tony.

Deceased
 Lorraine Calluzzo: shot by Billy Leotardo on orders from Johnny Sack for not kicking up direct to him.
 Jason Evanina: shot on orders from Johnny Sack, presumably by Billy Leotardo or Joey Peeps.

Title reference
 The episode's title is taken from the famous opening sentence of Leo Tolstoy's Anna Karenina: "All happy families are alike; every unhappy family is unhappy in its own way." It refers to the breakup of the Soprano household.

Production
 The episode's script was written by Toni Kalem, who also plays Angie Bonpensiero, and serves as story editor on several episodes of season five.
 The character of Ira Fried was recast in this episode with actor John Pleshette. The role was initially played by Lewis J. Stadlen.
 This is the first time that singer Frankie Valli portrays Lupertazzi capo Rusty Millio. Valli himself was mentioned before—in the season four episode "Christopher"—and had his songs played in some episodes.
Bernie Brillstein, who plays himself at the card game, is the business partner of Sopranos executive producer Brad Grey. Also appearing in the card game is former New York Giants linebacker Lawrence Taylor (whom Tony refers to, in reverence, as “Sir Lawrence of the Meadowlands”) and, in a separate card game, Van Halen vocalist David Lee Roth.
 Leon Wieseltier, longtime literary editor of The New Republic, plays car-theft victim Stewart Silverman.

References to other people, characters, and popular culture
 As Christopher and Benny pay a visit to Feech, he called them "Olsen and Johnson." This was in reference to the popular vaudeville duo in the first half of the 20th century.
 Tony's greeting to white-bearded, portly, Brillstein, upon entering the card game, likens Brillstein to Santa Claus.
 Meadow and Finn are watching the film Frida on TV.
 Tony, Artie, Tony B., and A.J. watch "The $99,000 Answer" episode of The Honeymooners on TV.
 While trying to connect with A.J., Carmela references the "drum solo" from The Beatles' song "Birthday", which she mistakenly calls "Happy Birthday."

Music
 Edison Lighthouse's "Love Grows (Where My Rosemary Goes)" is played in the background, probably on a radio, while Lorraine is murdered.
 The Starlight Orchestra performs "Siman Tov! Mazel Tov!" during the Horah at the wedding reception.
 As Tony and Carmela see Mr. Wegler about A.J., Tony asks what A.J. did: "Did he call the teacher 'Daddy-O'?" This was based on a line from The Coasters song, "Charlie Brown."
 One scene in the Bada Bing features The Cars' "Moving in Stereo".
 In the scene where Tony is arguing with Feech, Jimi Hendrix's "Who Knows" can be heard in the background throughout the scene.
 As A.J. and his friends smoke marijuana in the hotel room, "Trouble" by West Coast rapper Roscoe can be heard playing in the background.
The music played over the end credits is "La Petite Mer" by Thierry Robin.
"Beat Connection" by LCD Soundsystem can be heard in a scene set in the Crazy Horse.
"Nobody Loves and Leaves Alive" by Little Steven and the Lost Boys (real-life band of Steven van Zandt) is the song silently pointed out to Tony by Silvio when it is playing in the Crazy Horse.

References

External links
"All Happy Families..."  at HBO

The Sopranos (season 5) episodes
2004 American television episodes